Perperek is a village in Kardzhali Municipality, Kardzhali Province, southern Bulgaria.

Population
According to the 2011 census, the collage of Perperek has 706 inhabitants. Perperek has a Turkish speaking population, consisting of ethnic Turks (59%) and Romani people (38%). There are also a few ethnic Bulgarians (3%) living in the village.

References

Villages in Kardzhali Province